Rebecca Gayheart (born August 12, 1971) is an American actress and model. She began her career as a teen model in the 1980s and subsequently appeared in a student short film by Brett Ratner, with whom she had an extensive relationship.

In the early 1990s, Gayheart signed a contract with Noxzema and became a spokesperson for the company. On television, she had a starring role on the series Earth 2 (1994–1995) and was a recurring guest star on Beverly Hills, 90210 (1995). She made her feature film debut in the comedy Nothing to Lose (1997) and then had a lead role in the slasher film Urban Legend (1998). She subsequently starred in the black comedy film Jawbreaker (1999), followed by supporting roles in the thriller Shadow Hours (2000) and the independent comedy Harvard Man (2001).

In June 2001, Gayheart fatally struck a young boy with her vehicle in Los Angeles, an event that was widely publicized, and was ultimately sentenced to probation and community service. She returned to acting several years later, appearing in recurring guest roles on the television series Dead Like Me (2003), Nip/Tuck (2004–2006), and Vanished (2006). In 2005, Gayheart made her Broadway debut in a production of Steel Magnolias. She returned to Broadway again in a 2008 production of Boeing-Boeing, opposite Mark Rylance and Christine Baranski. In 2019, Gayheart appeared in a minor supporting role in Quentin Tarantino's Once Upon a Time in Hollywood.

Early life
Gayheart was born August 12, 1971 in Hazard, Kentucky, the third of four children born to Floneva "Flo" Gayheart (née Slone), who worked as a Mary Kay independent beauty consultant, and Curtis Gayheart, a miner and coal-truck driver. She has two sisters, Elizabeth and Rachel, and one brother, Curtis Wayne Gayheart. She is of German, English, Scottish and Scots-Irish descent. Gayheart spent her early life in Pine Top, Kentucky. In her first year of high school, she starred in a stage play chronicling the life of Lizzie Borden, in which she played the titular Borden.

At age 15, Gayheart won a local modeling contest, after which she relocated to New York City. There, she completed her high school education at the Professional Children's School and went on to attend the actors' conservatory of the Lee Strasberg Theatre and Film Institute. Meanwhile, Gayheart earned a living appearing in commercials for Campbell's soup and Burger King, and also modeled for J. C. Penney catalogues.

Career
In her first film role, Gayheart appeared in Brett Ratner's New York University short film Whatever Happened to Mason Reese? (1990) starring Mason Reese. She also appeared in the Ratner-directed music video Nuttin' But Love performed by Heavy D and the Boyz.

Gayheart's break into the television industry was a series of television commercials for Noxzema in the early 1990s, earning her the moniker "The Noxzema Girl". The commercials began airing in 1991 and brought her national recognition. In 1992, Gayheart was cast in her first major role on the soap opera Loving as Hannah Mayberry. In 1993 and 1994, she had a recurring role in the Vanishing Son action series as cellist Clair Rutledge, the love interest of Russell Wong's main character, Jian-Wa Chang. In 1994 and 1995, Gayheart played Bess Martin in the science-fiction series Earth 2. In 1995, she played Antonia Marchette, a recurring character in the series Beverly Hills, 90210, and Luke Perry's character's love interest; the character was killed off after a 10-episode storyline. She was subsequently cast in her feature film debut in the comedy Nothing to Lose (1997) opposite Tim Robbins and Martin Lawrence, portraying a flower shop employee who nearly woos an advertising executive (Robbins). The same year, she had a minor role as a sorority sister in Wes Craven's horror film Scream 2 (1997).

After completing Scream 2, Gayheart was cast in a lead role in the slasher film Urban Legend (1998), in which she portrayed the best friend of a college student (Alicia Witt) who suspects their friends are being murdered according to urban legends. The same year, she appeared onstage at Toronto's Canon Theatre in a production of The Last Night of Ballyhoo, opposite Rhea Perlman and Perrey Reeves. In 1999, Gayheart starred in the black comedy film Jawbreaker with Rose McGowan, Julie Benz, and Judy Greer as girls in an exclusive clique in their high school who inadvertently kill their friend. Though the film was a box-office failure, it went on to earn a cult following in subsequent decades.

Gayheart starred as the waitress in the Train music video for the 1999 song "Meet Virginia".

In 2000, Gayheart had a lead role in the vampire film From Dusk Till Dawn 3: The Hangman's Daughter, as well as a lead role in the thriller Shadow Hours, opposite Balthazar Getty. She also had a cameo appearance in Urban Legends: Final Cut, the sequel to Urban Legend.

In 2002, Gayheart was hired for the role of Inara Serra on the television series Firefly but was fired after only one day of filming. Show creator Joss Whedon said that a lack of chemistry existed between  the rest of the cast and her. The role was recast with actress Morena Baccarin, who reportedly filmed her first scene the day she was accepted for the role. None of Gayheart's work was used.

From March to July 2005, Gayheart starred in a Broadway production of Steel Magnolias. David Rooney of Variety praised her performance, writing: "Exuding all the breezy confidence of a girl who's always been popular and pretty, Gayheart's Shelby provides a strong center, allowing only brief glimpses of the cracks in her cheerful, optimistic veneer and refusing to be treated as fragile goods by the clucking women around her." She also appeared in a minor role in the Christmas horror-comedy film Santa's Slay (2005). In 2007, Gayheart guest-starred on Ugly Betty as Jordan, an ex-girlfriend of Alexis Meade. The following year, she returned to Broadway in a revival of the comedy, Boeing-Boeing opposite Christine Baranski, Mark Rylance, Greg Germann, Paige Davis, and Missi Pyle. She had a guest role on The Cleaner in 2009.

Gayheart returned to film in 2013, reuniting with Jawbreaker director Darren Stein for his comedy G.B.F., portraying the mother of a gay teenage boy. She also starred opposite her husband, Dane, in the 2017-released thriller film Grey Lady, which was filmed in 2014.

In 2019, Gayheart returned to film with a minor supporting role in Quentin Tarantino's Once Upon a Time in Hollywood, playing Billie Booth, the wife of Brad Pitt's character.

Personal life
Gayheart had met Brett Ratner at age 15 on the day she moved to New York City in 1986, and the two carried on a romantic relationship that spanned 13 years. She and Ratner were engaged in 1997, but the couple eventually separated in 1999.

On June 13, 2001, while driving a vehicle owned by Italian actor Marco Leonardi (her From Dusk Till Dawn 3 co-star), Gayheart struck nine-year-old Jorge Cruz, Jr. as he walked across a street in Los Angeles. Cruz died the following day from his injuries. Gayheart paid the family $10,000 for Cruz's funeral expenses and was given permission by the family to attend the service, but ultimately chose not to. On August 7, 2001, Gayheart made her only public statement on the incident, in which she said: "The pain of this tragedy will live with me forever. Despite the allegations in the lawsuit, the facts will establish that this was a most unfortunate accident." On November 27, 2001, Gayheart pleaded no contest to vehicular manslaughter. She was sentenced to three years of probation, a one-year suspension of her license, a $2,800 fine, and 750 hours of community service. The parents of the boy filed a wrongful death lawsuit, which was eventually settled out of court.

Gayheart married actor Eric Dane on October 29, 2004, in Las Vegas. Dane told Flaunt magazine about how they met: "It's probably one of the least interesting stories in the world. It went basically like this: 'You wanna go out?' 'Yeah, sure.' Ten months later, we were married."

On August 17, 2009, a nude video was posted on the website gawker.com that showed former Miss Teen USA contestant Kari Ann Peniche with Gayheart and husband Eric Dane.

On March 3, 2010, Gayheart gave birth to her first child with Dane, a daughter in Los Angeles. The following year, she gave birth to her second daughter with Dane on December 28, 2011.

In February 2018, Gayheart filed for divorce from Dane after 14 years of marriage, citing "irreconcilable differences."

Filmography

Film

Television

Stage credits

Notes

References

External links

 
 
 

1971 births
Living people
Actresses from Kentucky
American film actresses
American stage actresses
American television actresses
American people of German descent
American people of Irish descent
American people of English descent
American people of Scottish descent
Female models from Kentucky
Lee Strasberg Theatre and Film Institute alumni
People from Knott County, Kentucky
People from Hazard, Kentucky
21st-century American women